The 1968 U.S. Pro Tennis Championships was a men's professional tennis tournament played on outdoor grass courts courts at the Longwood Cricket Club in Chestnut Hill, Massachusetts. It was the 41st edition of the tournament, the first of the Open Era, and was scheduled to be held from June 12 through June 16, 1968. Due to bad weather the final was postponed from July to September 10, 1968. Rod Laver won the singles title, his fourth at the event, and earned $8,000 first-prize money.

Finals

Singles
 Rod Laver defeated  John Newcombe 7–5, 6–4, 6–4

References

External links
 Longwood Cricket Club – list of U.S. Pro Champions

U.S. Pro Tennis Championships
U.S. Pro Tennis Championships
U.S. Pro Tennis Championships
U.S. Pro Tennis Championships
Chestnut Hill, Massachusetts
History of Middlesex County, Massachusetts
U.S. Pro Tennis Championships
U.S. Pro Tennis Championships
Sports in Middlesex County, Massachusetts
Tennis tournaments in Massachusetts
Tourist attractions in Middlesex County, Massachusetts